Sam Middleton (April 2, 1927 – July 19, 2015) was a mixed-media artist from New York City. He travelled all over the world with the US Merchant Marine, lived in Mexico and Sweden and eventually settled down in the Netherlands where he "was part of the considerable contingency of expatriate African American artists". Settling in Holland in 1961, he established himself as one of The Netherlands' premier artists. His work is part of the Whitney Museum permanent collection, which included him in its 1962 exhibition 40 Artists Under 40  and was included in the 2015 inaugural exhibition for the museum's new building on the High Line.

Middleton was born in New York City and grew up in the Harlem neighborhood of the city. Known for his personal style, Middleton liked to use abstract expressionism in his work, basing his color, lines, and compositions around sound and harmony. Middleton specialized in working with collage.

Early life 
As a young boy growing up in Harlem, Middleton often visited the nearby Savoy Ballroom and music – jazz and classical – became important inspirations for his artistic endeavors. Working at the Savoy, Middleton designed costumes, and painted record and book covers.
Middleton’s early painting was heavily influenced by the musicians of the Harlem renaissance, such as Duke Ellington, Ella Fitzgerald, and Billie Holiday. When he was 17, Middleton left Harlem to work on a boat with the Merchant Marines, to get away from Harlem and have time to paint. While abroad, Middleton visited art galleries and museums for inspiration.

Career 
Middleton struggled as an artist in the United States, due to his race and status, but continued to refine his technique, studying with other Black creatives like Beauford Delaney. In 1956, Middleton won a scholarship to the Institute Allende in San Miguel Allende, Mexico, and studied in Mexico for the next several years. In 1959, after significantly advancing his technical skill and having the opportunity to showcase his art, Middleton travelled to Europe to paint, living in Spain, Sweden, France, and Denmark before settling in the Netherlands in 1961. After moving to the Netherlands, Middleton returned to Harlem periodically, but never again held residence in America, despite calls from fellow African Americans to return. Middleton found greater creative freedom in Holland while holding onto his jazz influences.

Emigration 
Middleton moved to the Netherlands as part of a wave of African American artists, along with Deborah Simon, Sherard Van Dyke and Lorina Harris. He remained in Europe to escape racism and lack of opportunity for African Americans in the United States, but was uninvolved with the civil rights movement. Because of his expatriate status, and the fact that his artwork wasn’t focused on his race, Middleton’s paintings are largely absent from African American art collections in the United States. He did, however, become a figure in the Dutch art community, and opened his doors to other African American artists who came to the Netherlands, helping them gain traction in Europe. Middleton was able to display exhibitions of his artwork in a prominent Dutch art gallery, an opportunity that was limited to very few Black artists in America. He lived in Amsterdam for many years but, fascinated by the landscape, settled in Oterleek and Schagen in North Holland in 1973. Music, (both classical and jazz) and the landscape of North Holland, created the climate of his abstract expressionist work. Middleton’s style evolved to reflect newfound inspirations, like the expansive tulip fields of the country. His paintings became fuller and softer, while maintaining their distinct jazz connections.

Middleton taught at Atelier '63 in Haarlem and the Royal Academy of Art in ‘s Hertogenbosch, jobs that provided enough income to fuel his artistic career. He married twice, had three sons, one daughter and eight grandchildren, one great.
sw

List of artworks
Out Chorus, 1960, part of the Whitney Museum collection

Cymbals, 1962

Hymn to Democracy, 1962

Social Realism, 1964

Everyone's Music Book, 1975

Summer Wind, 1976

Black Music, 1993

Solo, 1993

Table Top Still Life, 1996

Monk Lost in Music, 2001

References

External links
 "Sam Middleton - Afro-American Artist in the Low Countries". Oogland Filmproducties. Vimeo.

1927 births
2015 deaths
American artists
American emigrants to the Netherlands